Zygaenosia klossi is a moth in the family Erebidae. It was described by Walter Rothschild in 1915. It is found in Papua New Guinea.

References

Nudariina
Moths described in 1915
Zygaenosia